Painted Skin is a Chinese television series adapted from the 2008 film of the same title, which, in turn, is loosely based on a classic short story in Pu Songling's Strange Stories from a Chinese Studio. It was first broadcast on TVS4 on 3 March 2011 in mainland China.

A sequel series based on the second film, Painted Skin: The Resurrection, was broadcast in 2013.

Cast
 Fiona Sit as Xiaowei / Xuxu
 Tammy Chen as Peirong
 Gui Gui as Xia Bing
 Li Zonghan as Pang Yong
 Ling Xiaosu as Wang Sheng
 Yang Mi as Xiaohong
 Law Kar-ying as Xia Yingfeng
 Qi Yuwu as Long Yun
 Dong Yijin as Xiaoyi
 Xin Zhilei as Susu
 Jiang Tianyang as Ye Yi
 Zhao Yi as Sha Luo
 Hai Bo as Wang Chengzhou
 Hinson Chou as Yu Zhi
 Han Zhenhua as Chen Huichuan
 Zhang Jin as Yuan Ren
 Lou Yajiang as Yang Gang
 Liu Chenxia as Peirong's mother

Production
The production team of the 2008 film, Painted Skin, including its director and producer Gordon Chan, were involved in the planning and production of this television series. Chan mentioned that the television series would not be a repetition of the film, as the script used for the film would be revised, and more focus would be placed on the relationships between the main characters Xiaowei, Wang Sheng, Peirong, Pang Yong and Xia Bing. Shooting began on 8 September 2010 in Beijing and wrapped up in December.

References

External links
  Painted Skin official page on Sina.com

2011 Chinese television series debuts
Television series set in the Western Han dynasty
Television shows based on Strange Stories from a Chinese Studio
Shenzhen Television original programming